Çomak is a village in the Besni District, Adıyaman Province, Turkey. Its population is 900 (2021).

The hamlet of Hüyük is attached to the village.

References

Villages in Besni District